The Clifford-Wyrick House is a historic house located at 105 South Second Street in Clarksville, Pike County, Missouri.

Description and history 
It was constructed in 1878, and is a one-story, irregularly-shaped, vernacular Italianate style frame dwelling. It is sheathed in clapboard siding. It features a two-bay porch across the south part of the facade and projecting gabled bays.

It was listed on the National Register of Historic Places on July 9, 1984. It is located in the Clarksville Historic District.

References

Individually listed contributing properties to historic districts on the National Register in Missouri
Houses on the National Register of Historic Places in Missouri
Italianate architecture in Missouri
Houses completed in 1878
Buildings and structures in Pike County, Missouri
National Register of Historic Places in Pike County, Missouri